The Hahnenklee Crags are a rock formation west of Braunlage in the district of Goslar in Lower Saxony, Germany. They consist of hornfels.

Walking destination 
The Hahnenklee Crags are a popular walking destination and can be reached from Königskrug or Braunlage. From the Hahnenklee Forest Road (Hahnenkleer Waldstraße) a 250 metre long path branches off to the 740 metre high viewing point. Further west the terrain drops 200 m almost vertically to the Oder river. On the opposite side, 800 metres away, the High Crags (Hohen Klippen) on the Rehberg (893 m) border the Oder valley. 

The crags are checkpoint no. 75 in the Harzer Wandernadel hiking network.

Origin of the name 
The Hahnenklee Crags have nothing to do with the village of Hahnenklee in the Harz, but are derived from  Hahnenkliev, which also means Hohe Klippen or "high crags".

See also 
 List of rock formations in the Harz

Rock formations of the Harz
Braunlage
Rock formations of Lower Saxony